The Classic BRIT Awards (previously Classical BRIT Awards) are an annual awards ceremony held in the United Kingdom covering aspects of classical and crossover music, and are the equivalent of popular music's Brit Awards. The awards are organised by the British Phonographic Industry (BPI) and were inaugurated in 2000 "in recognition of the achievements of classical musicians and the growth of classical music sales in the UK".

The ceremony takes place in the Royal Albert Hall each May. The event combines live performances with specially commissioned awards presented throughout the evening. Since 2011, the ceremony has been known as "Classic BRIT Awards". After a five-year hiatus following the 2013 ceremony, the Classic BRIT Awards returned with a ceremony broadcast from the Royal Albert Hall on 13 June 2018. It was subsequently revealed that the Classic BRIT Awards would become a biennial event, with the next ceremony scheduled to be held in 2020. However, due to the impact of the COVID-19 pandemic on television networks across the globe; the 2020 live ceremony were suspended to a later date due to a ban on large gatherings by the government in March of that year.

Voting for the awards is done by "an academy of industry executives, the media, the British Association of Record Dealers (BARD), members of the Musicians Union, lawyers, promoters, and orchestra leaders," except for "Album of the Year" which is voted for by listeners of Classic FM.

Awards

2000 
Friday 5 May 2000. Hosted by Sir Trevor McDonald.

British Artist of the Year – Charlotte Church
Female Artist of the Year – Martha Argerich
Male Artist of the Year – Bryn Terfel
Critics' Award – Ian Bostridge
Album of the Year – Andrea Bocelli – Sacred Arias
Best selling classical album – Andrea Bocelli – Sacred Arias
Ensemble/Orchestral Album of the Year – Choir of King's College, Cambridge – Rachmaninoff Vespers
Young British Classical Performer – Daniel Harding
Outstanding Contribution to Music – Nigel Kennedy

2001 
Thursday 31 May 2001. Hosted by Katie Derham.

Female Artist of the Year – Angela Gheorghiu
Male Artist of the Year – Nigel Kennedy
Album of the Year – Russell Watson – The Voice
Ensemble/Orchestral Album of the Year – Sir Simon Rattle and Berliner Philharmoniker – Mahler, 10th Symphony
Young British Classical Performer – Freddy Kempf
Critics' Award – Sir Simon Rattle and Berliner Philarmoniker – Mahler, 10th Symphony
Best-selling Debut Album – Russell Watson – The Voice
Outstanding Contribution to Music – Sir Simon Rattle

2002 
Wednesday 22 May 2002. Hosted by Katie Derham.

Female Artist of the Year – Cecilia Bartoli
Male Artist of the Year – Sir Colin Davis
Album of the Year – Russell Watson – Encore
Ensemble/Orchestral Album of the Year – Richard Hickox and London Symphony Orchestra – Vaughan Williams, A London Symphony
Contemporary Music Award – Tan Dun – Crouching Tiger, Hidden Dragon
Young British Classical Performer – Guy Johnston
Critics' Award – Sir Colin Davis and London Symphony Orchestra – Berlioz, Les Troyens
Biggest-selling Classical Album – Russell Watson – Encore
Outstanding Contribution to Music – Andrea Bocelli

2003 
Thursday 22 May 2003. Hosted by Katie Derham.

Female Artist of the Year – Renée Fleming
Male Artist of the Year – Sir Simon Rattle
Album of the Year – Andrea Bocelli – Sentimento
Best selling classical album – Andrea Bocelli – Sentimento
Ensemble/Orchestral Album of the Year – Berliner Philharmoniker and Sir Simon Rattle – Mahler, Symphony no. 5
Contemporary Music Award – Arvo Pärt – Orient & Occident
Young British Classical Performer – Chloë Hanslip
Critics' Award – Murray Perahia – Chopin, Etudes Opus 10, Opus 25
Outstanding Contribution to Music – Cecilia Bartoli

2004 
Wednesday 26 May 2004. Hosted by Katie Derham.

Female Artist of the Year – Cecilia Bartoli
Male Artist of the Year – Bryn Terfel
Album of the Year – Bryn Terfel – Bryn
Ensemble/Orchestral Album of the Year – Sir Simon Rattle and Vienna Philharmonic – Beethoven Symphonies
Contemporary Music Award – Philip Glass – The Hours
Young British Classical Performer – Daniel Hope
Critics' Award – Vengerov, Rostropovich and London Symphony Orchestra – Britten/Walton Concertos
Outstanding Contribution to Music – Renée Fleming

2005 
Wednesday 25 May 2005. Hosted by Lesley Garrett.

Female Artist of the Year – Marin Alsop
Male Artist of the Year – Bryn Terfel
Album of the Year – Katherine Jenkins – Second Nature
Ensemble/Orchestral Album of the Year – Harry Christophers and The Sixteen – Renaissance
Contemporary Music Award – John Adams – On the Transmigration of Souls
Soundtrack Composer Award – John Williams – Harry Potter and the Prisoner of Azkaban and The Terminal
Young British Classical Performer – Natalie Clein
Critics' Award – Stephen Hough – Rachmaninov Piano Concertos
Outstanding Contribution to Music – James Galway

2006 
Thursday 4 May 2006. Hosted by Michael Parkinson.

Singer of the Year – Andreas Scholl – Arias for Senesino
Instrumentalist of the Year – Leif Ove Andsnes – Rachmaninov Piano Concerto 1 and 2
Album of the Year – Katherine Jenkins – Living A Dream
Ensemble/Orchestral Album of the Year – Takács Quartet – Beethoven: The Late String Quartets
Contemporary Music Award – James MacMillan – Symphony no 3, Silence
Soundtrack/Musical Theatre Composer Award – Dario Marianelli – Pride & Prejudice
Young British Classical Performer – Alison Balsom
Critics' Award – Royal Opera House Chorus and Orchestra, Plácido Domingo, Antonio Pappano – Tristan und Isolde
Lifetime Achievement – Plácido Domingo

2007 
Thursday 3 May 2007. Hosted by Fern Britton.

Singer of the Year – Anna Netrebko – Russian Album & Violetta
Instrumentalist of the Year – Leif Ove Andsnes – Horizons
Album of the Year – Paul McCartney – Ecce Cor Meum
Contemporary Composer of the Year – John Adams – The Dharma at Big Sur/My Father Knew Charles Ives
Classical Recording of the Year – Berliner Philharmoniker and Sir Simon Rattle – Holst, The Planets
Soundtrack Composer of the Year – George Fenton – Planet Earth
Young British Classical Performer – Ruth Palmer
Critics' Award – Freiburg Baroque Orchestra, RIAS Kammerchor, René Jacobs – Mozart, La Clemenza di Tito
Lifetime Achievement – Vernon Handley

2008 
Thursday 8 May 2008. Hosted by Myleene Klass.

Male of the Year – Sir Colin Davis
Female of the Year – Anna Netrebko
Young British Classical Performer – Nicola Benedetti
Album of the Year – Blake – Blake
Soundtrack of the Year – Blood Diamond – James Newton Howard
Critics' Award – Steven Isserlis – Bach: Cello Suites
Outstanding Contribution — Andrew Lloyd Webber

2009 
Thursday 14 May 2009. Hosted by Myleene Klass.

Male of the Year – Gustavo Dudamel
Female of the Year – Alison Balsom
Composer of the Year – Howard Goodall
Young British Classical Performer – Alina Ibragimova
Album of the Year – Royal Scots Dragoon Guards Spirit of the Glen–Journey
Soundtrack of the Year – The Dark Knight – Hans Zimmer and James Newton Howard
Critics' Award – Sir Charles Mackerras/Scottish Chamber Orchestra – Mozart Symphonies nos. 38–41
Lifetime Achievement in Music – José Carreras

2010 
Thursday 13 May 2010. Hosted by Myleene Klass.

Male Artist of the Year – Vasily Petrenko
Female Artist of the Year – Angela Gheorghiu
Composer of the Year – Thomas Ades – The Tempest
Young British Classical Performer or Group of the Year – Jack Liebeck
Album of the Year – Only Men Aloud! – Band of Brothers
Soundtrack of the Year – Revolutionary Road – Thomas Newman
Critics' Award –  Orchestra e Coro dell'Accademia Nazionale di Santa Cecilia, conducted by Antonio Pappano with Rolando Villazón, Anja Harteros, Sonja Ganassi and Rene Pape – Messa da Requiem
Lifetime Achievement in Music – Kiri Te Kanawa

2011 
Thursday 12 May 2011. Hosted by Myleene Klass.

Male Artist of the Year – Antonio Pappano
Female Artist of the Year – Alison Balsom
Newcomer Award – Vilde Frang
Composer of the Year – Arvo Pärt
Critics' Award – Tasmin Little
Artist of the Decade – Il Divo
Album of the Year – André Rieu & Johann Strauss Orchestra (Decca) – Moonlight Serenade
Outstanding Contribution to Music – John Barry

2012 
Tuesday 2 October 2012. Hosted by Myleene Klass.

International Artist of the Year – Andrea Bocelli
Lifetime Achievement Award – John Williams
Special Recognition Award – Classic FM (UK)
Female Artist of the Year – Nicola Benedetti
Male Artist of the Year  – Vasily Petrenko
Breakthrough Artist of the Year – Milos Karadaglic
Composer of the Year – John Williams
Critics Award – Benjamin Grosvenor
Album of the Year – And the Waltz Goes On
Single of the Year – "Wherever You Are"

2013
Wednesday 2 October 2013. Hosted by Myleene Klass.

International Artist of the Year  – Lang Lang
Lifetime Achievement Award – Luciano Pavarotti (posthumous)
Female Artist of the Year – Nicola Benedetti
Male Artist of the Year  – Daniel Barenboim
Breakthrough Artist of the Year – Tine Thing Helseth
Composer of the Year – Hans Zimmer
Critics Award – Jonas Kaufmann
Album of the Year – André Rieu, Magic of the Movies
Outstanding Contribution to Music; Hans Zimmer

2018
Wednesday 13 June 2018. Hosted by Myleene Klass and Alexander Armstrong

Female Artist of the Year – Renée Fleming
Male Artist of the Year – Sheku Kanneh-Mason
Group of the Year – Michael Ball & Alfie Boe
Soundtrack of the Year — The Greatest Showman OST (Benj Pasek & Justin Paul)
Critics’ Choice in association with Apple Music – Sheku Kanneh-Mason
Classic FM Album of the Year – Michael Ball & Alfie Boe
Classic BRITs Icon – Andrea Bocelli
Sound of Classical 2018 – Jess Gillam
PPL Classic BRITs Breakthrough Artist of the Year – Tokio Myers
Special Recognition Award for Musical Theatre & Education – Andrew Lloyd Webber
Lifetime Achievement Award – Dame Vera Lynn

References

External links 

Classic BRIT Awards Official website
BRIT Awards Official website
2000 Awards — BBC News
2001 Awards — BBC News
2002 Awards — BBC News
2003 Awards — BBC News
2004 Awards — BBC News
2005 Awards — BBC News
2006 Awards — BBC News
2007 Awards — BBC News
2010 Awards — Classic FM
2011 Awards — Classic FM
2012 Awards — Classic FM

2000 establishments in the United Kingdom
Awards established in 2000
Brit Awards
British music awards
Classical music in the United Kingdom
Classical music awards
ITV (TV network) original programming
Annual events in the United Kingdom